Ravne is a small settlement in the hills above the right bank of the Sava River northwest of Gabrovka in the Municipality of Litija in central Slovenia. The area is part of the traditional region of Lower Carniola. It is now included with the rest of the municipality in the Central Sava Statistical Region.

The local church, built on Ostrež Hill south of the settlement, is dedicated to Saint Catherine and belongs to the Parish of Polšnik. It is a 16th-century building that was restyled in the Baroque in the 18th century.

References

External links
Ravne on Geopedia

Populated places in the Municipality of Litija